is a Japanese former professional basketball player who played for the Akita Northern Happinets of the bj League in Japan. He was a man behind the mascot Bicky. He currently lives in Fukuoka Prefecture.

Career statistics

Regular season 

|-
| align="left" | 2013-14
| align="left" | Akita
|16|| ||2.9||.286||.000||.250||0.4 ||0.2||0.1||0||0.6
|-

Playoffs 

|-
|style="text-align:left;"|2013-14
|style="text-align:left;"|Akita
| 2 || 0 ||1.50  || .000   || .000 || .000 ||00 ||0.0 || 0.5|| 0 ||0
|-

References

1987 births
Living people
Akita Northern Happinets players

Japanese men's basketball players
People from Niigata (city)
Sportspeople from Niigata Prefecture